Alebra rubrafrons is a species of leafhopper in the family Cicadellidae.

References

Further reading

External links

 
 

Insects described in 1918
Alebrini